Hurricane Gustav was the only major hurricane that formed during the 1990 Atlantic hurricane season. Developing out of a tropical wave on August 24, Gustav tracked westward across the Atlantic Ocean, steadily intensifying. The storm reached hurricane-status on August 26 and reached its initial peak intensity as a strong Category 2 hurricane the following day. After turning towards the north and weakening due to increased wind shear, the storm encountered more favorable conditions and re-intensified, attaining peak winds of  around 0600 UTC on August 31. Gradual weakening took place in the following days. on September 2, the former hurricane underwent an extratropical transition and dissipated shortly after completing it.

Hurricane Gustav initially posed a significant threat to the Lesser Antilles which had already suffered severe damages from Hurricane Hugo in 1989. Several watches and warnings were issued for the islands between August 26 and 27; however, due to the northward turn, Gustav did not directly impact the region. Only light rain and large swells were reported. Offshore, a ship encountered the storm and sustained hull damage.

Meteorological history

Hurricane Gustav originated out of a tropical wave that moved off the western coast of Africa on August 18. Shortly after, the system became embedded within the Intertropical Convergence Zone and tracked westward across the Atlantic Ocean. By August 23, the system began to intensify while convective activity become consolidated around the center of circulation. A weak ridge of high pressure to the north of the depression led to a general westward movement of the system. Gradually strengthening, the depression was upgraded to a tropical storm early on August 25, at which time it was given the name Gustav.

A cold-core low-pressure system near Gustav was forecast to have an effect on the development of the system; however, the tropical storm continued to intensify, attaining hurricane status around 1200 UTC on August 26. Not long after attaining hurricane-status, the ridge steering Gustav to the west began to break down, causing the hurricane to slowly turn towards the north. Later that day, the storm made its closest approach to the Lesser Antilles, passing  to the east. By this time, hurricane and tropical storm-force winds extended  from the center respectively.

Tracking towards the north, Hurricane Gustav slightly weakened due to increasing wind shear, with winds decreasing to  early on August 29. A trough located near Bermuda and the ridge located to the east of the hurricane kept Gustav on a northward track. The following day, the hurricane re-intensified and again reached Category 2 status. This initiated a Fujiwhara interaction between the two storms, causing Hortense to track counterclockwise around the more intense Gustav.

Throughout September 1, the storm weakened and the following day, it began to track towards the north-northeast as the ridge located to the east of it strengthened. The trough located west of Gustav began accelerating late on September 2, causing the hurricane to track towards the northeast, away from Newfoundland. By this time, Gustav had entered the Canadian Hurricane Centres area of responsibility, leading to them initiating advisories on the weakening storm. Early the next day, the former hurricane underwent and completed an extratropical transition.

Preparations and impact
At around 1600 UTC on August 26, the National Hurricane Center issued hurricane watches for Dominica, Martinique, St. Martin, Anguilla, Guadeloupe, Antigua, Barbuda, Montserrat, and St. Kitts and Nevis. Six hours later, the watch was upgraded to a hurricane warning for Guadeloupe, Antigua, Barbuda, Montserrat, and St. Kitts and Nevis. Local meteorological agencies on the islands also declared small craft advisories. The local government in Montserrat mobilized the 100 member police force and 50 off-duty volunteer army members. Supermarkets, hardware stores, banks, and pharmacies were specially opened for residents to purchase plywood, canned food, bottled water, and other hurricane kit items. Around 1300 UTC on August 27, the hurricane watch for Dominica and Martinique was discontinued as Gustav no longer posed a direct threat to the islands. Three hours later, all watches and warnings were discontinued except for Antigua and Barbuda where a tropical storm warning and St. Martin where a tropical storm watch were in place. By 1900 UTC, once Hurricane Gustav turned towards the north away from the Lesser Antilles, all watches and warnings were discontinued.

Gustav had only effects on the Lesser Antilles. Large swells, light rain, and gusty winds were reported along the outer fringes of the hurricane. On August 30, the Egyptian motorship Raseltin encountered rough seas in relation to Gustav, and the hull of the ship was damaged. The remnants of Gustav severely impacted a seismic research operation off the coast of the United Kingdom which took place between August 25 and September 12. The purpose of the operation was to collect seismic reflection profiles of the Rockfall Plateau. On September 3, the members of the team had to quickly retrieve all buoys that were deployed to avoid damage to the sensors. However, some of the research tools were damaged before they were recovered. In all, the storm delayed the project by two days.

See also

Other storms named Gustav

References

External links
The National Hurricane Center's Preliminary Report on Hurricane Gustav

1990 Atlantic hurricane season
1990 in the Caribbean
Cape Verde hurricanes
Category 3 Atlantic hurricanes